Chamaeleon is a small constellation in the deep southern sky. It is named after the chameleon, a kind of lizard. It was first defined in the 16th century.

History 

Chamaeleon was one of twelve constellations created by Petrus Plancius from the observations of Pieter Dirkszoon Keyser and Frederick de Houtman. It first appeared on a 35-cm diameter celestial globe published in 1597 (or 1598) in Amsterdam by Plancius and Jodocus Hondius. Johann Bayer was the first uranographer to put Chamaeleon in a celestial atlas. It was one of many constellations created by European explorers in the 15th and 16th centuries out of unfamiliar Southern Hemisphere stars.

Features

Stars 

There are four bright stars in Chamaeleon that form a compact diamond-shape approximately 10 degrees from the south celestial pole and about 15 degrees south of Acrux, along the axis formed by Acrux and Gamma Crucis. Alpha Chamaeleontis is a white-hued star of magnitude 4.1, 63 light-years from Earth. Beta Chamaeleontis is a blue-white hued star of magnitude 4.2, 271 light-years from Earth. Gamma Chamaeleontis is a red-hued giant star of magnitude 4.1, 413 light-years from Earth. The other bright star in Chamaeleon is Delta Chamaeleontis, a wide double star. The brighter star is Delta2 Chamaeleontis, a blue-hued star of magnitude 4.4. Delta1 Chamaeleontis, the dimmer component, is an orange-hued giant star of magnitude 5.5. They both lie about 350 light years away.

Chamaeleon is also the location of Cha 110913, a unique dwarf star or proto solar system.

Deep-sky objects 

In 1999, a nearby open cluster was discovered centered on the star η Chamaeleontis. The cluster, known as either
the Eta Chamaeleontis cluster or Mamajek 1, is 8 million years old, and lies 316 light years from Earth.

The constellation contains a number of molecular clouds (the Chamaeleon dark clouds) that are forming low-mass T Tauri stars. The cloud complex lies some 400 to 600 light years from Earth, and contains tens of thousands of solar masses of gas and dust. The most prominent cluster of T Tauri stars and young B-type stars are in the Chamaeleon I cloud, and are associated with the reflection nebula IC 2631.

Chamaeleon contains one planetary nebula, NGC 3195, which is fairly faint. It appears in a telescope at about the same apparent size as Jupiter.

Equivalents 
In Chinese astronomy, the stars that form Chamaeleon were classified as the Little Dipper (小斗, Xiǎodǒu) among the Southern Asterisms (近南極星區, Jìnnánjíxīngōu) by Xu Guangqi. Chamaeleon is sometimes also called the Frying Pan in Australia.

See also
 Chamaeleon (Chinese astronomy)
 IAU-recognized constellations

Citations

References

External links 

 The Deep Photographic Guide to the Constellations: Chamaeleon
 The clickable Chamaeleon
 "The eta Chamaeleontis Cluster: A Remarkable New Nearby Young Open Cluster" (Mamajek, Lawson, & Feigelson 1999)
 "WEBDA open cluster database entry for Mamajek 1"
 Star Tales – Chamaeleon

 
Southern constellations
Constellations listed by Petrus Plancius
Dutch celestial cartography in the Age of Discovery
Astronomy in the Dutch Republic
1590s in the Dutch Republic